This is the list of tourist attractions in Pahang, Malaysia.

Memorials
 Gohtong Memorial Park

Museums
 Time Tunnel

Nature
 Bera Lake
 Berkelah Falls
 Cameron Highlands
 Cherating
 Cempedak Bay
 Chini Lake
 Endau-Rompin National Park
 Mount Benom
 Mount Benum
 Mount Irau
 Mount Nuang
 Mount Tahan
 National Park
 Tioman Island
 Raub Lake Park
 Fraser's Hill

Religious places

Buddhist temple
 Sam Poh Temple, Cameron Highlands

Chinese temple
 Chin Swee Caves Temple

Hindu temple
 Sri Marathandavar Bala Dhandayuthapani Alayam

Mosque
 Abu Bakar Royal Mosque
 Mohammad Noah Foundation Mosque
 Sultan Ahmad Shah State Mosque
 Tengku Ampuan Afzan Mosque

Sport centres
 Darul Makmur Stadium
 Tun Abdul Razak Stadium

Shopping centers
 First World Plaza
 East Cost Mall
 Berjaya Megamall

Theme parks and resorts
 Berjaya Hills Resort
 Genting Highlands

Transportation
 Genting Skyway

Towers
 Kuantan 188

See also
 List of tourist attractions in Malaysia

References

Pahang
Tourism in Malaysia